Charles Monroe Hoag (July 19, 1931 – March 8, 2012) was an American basketball player who competed in the 1952 Summer Olympics. Hoag was also an important player on the University of Kansas 1952 National Championship basketball team. He starred on the KU football team and baseball team while at KU as well.

He was drafted in the 1953 NFL Draft in the 26th round by the Cleveland Browns as the 311th overall pick, but he did not play professional sports because of a career ending serious knee injury he suffered in the 1953 KU versus KSU football game.

He was part of the U.S. men's national basketball team, which won the gold medal. He played seven matches.

References

External links
profile

1931 births
2012 deaths
American men's basketball players
Basketball players at the 1952 Summer Olympics
Basketball players from Oklahoma
Kansas Jayhawks baseball players
Kansas Jayhawks football players
Kansas Jayhawks men's basketball players
Medalists at the 1952 Summer Olympics
Olympic gold medalists for the United States in basketball
People from Guthrie, Oklahoma
United States men's national basketball team players